Flavius Paulus (floruit 512) was a Roman politician.

Biography 

Paulus was the son of Vivianus, consul in 463, and brother of Adamantius, praefectus urbi of Constantinople.

Paulus was first appointed patricius and later, in 512, consul. For his appointment to the consulate, he lent 1000 pounds of gold from Zenodotus, but he was not able to repay it, as his father, who was renowned for his generosity, had distributed much money during his office; it was emperor Anastasius I who paid back the debt in his place, giving another 1000 pounds of gold to Paul as a gift.

He was a zealous Christian, and Severus of Antioch dedicated him a treaty against Eutyches.

Bibliography 

 Arnold Hugh Martin Jones, "Fl. Paulus 34", The Prosopography of the Later Roman Empire, p. 854.

6th-century Christians
6th-century Byzantine people
6th-century Roman consuls
Imperial Roman consuls
Patricii